, previously , is a Japanese international school located in the Hiranandani Knowledge Park in Powai, Mumbai. The Japanese government funds the school, which is one of two Japanese international schools in India and serves a community of Japanese expatriates which numbered 270 in 2008.

History
It was established under the statutes of the Japanese Ministry of Education and Science in 1966.

The school was at one time in Andheri East, and before that, in Worli.

The school adopted its current name on 1 April 2014 (Heisei 26).

Campus
As of 2008 the campus has a media room, a common hall, a science laboratory, and seven air conditioned classrooms. As of 2008 there were 15 teachers, including 8 Japanese teachers and 7 Indian teachers. The subjects of geography, history, mathematics, and science are taught in Japanese, so the Japanese national teachers are responsible for those subjects. As of 2008 the number of students was 17. The school issues one laptop per student.

As of 2017, age of the school is 51 years old. Motto of this school is "grow big and become independent" (育てよ 大きく のびやかに). The name of this school's principal is Shoji Hashimoto (橋本 匠司 Hashimoto Shōji). The school has 13 teachers, including 4 native teachers, and 30 students. This is a small-scale school. This school’s big events are BJS school Festival, Gulmohar Festival, and Sports Day.

See also

 Japanese people in India

Indian schools in Japan:
 Global Indian International School, Tokyo Campus
 India International School in Japan
 Little Angels International School

References

Further reading
  Nagaishi, Akira (長石 彰; 前ボンベイ日本人学校教諭・鳥取大学教育地域科学部附属中学校教諭). "ボンベイ日本人学校における国際交流活動." 在外教育施設における指導実践記録 22, 23-26, 1999. Tokyo Gakugei University. See profile at CiNii.

External links
 Japanese School of Mumbai at Jimdo (official)
 Japanese School of Mumbai at Geocities (official)

International schools in Mumbai
Mumbai
Mumbai
1966 establishments in Maharashtra
Educational institutions established in 1966